Transmembrane protein 182 is a protein that in humans is encoded by the TMEM182 gene.

References

Further reading